Knight Rider is an American action television series that follows the 1982 television series of the same title created by Glen A. Larson and the 2008 television movie. The series aired on NBC from September 24, 2008 to March 4, 2009. The series stars Justin Bruening as Michael Traceur, the estranged son of Michael Knight; at the end of the pilot episode, Traceur renames himself Michael Knight II. The series also stars Deanna Russo as Sarah Graiman, Traceur's former girlfriend and love interest. Sarah is the daughter of Charles Graiman. Graiman, played by Bruce Davison, is the creator of a new generation of KITT (Knight Industries Three Thousand), which is voiced by Val Kilmer and based on a Ford Mustang Shelby GT500KR. The series was in production for just one season.

Plot
Continuing from the pilot movie, Mike Traceur is partnered with KITT and works for Knight Industries Research and Development, a secret intelligence agency overseen by NSA Agent Alex Torres and FBI Agent Carrie Rivai. Other team members include Charles Graiman and his daughter Sarah, Tech specialists Billy Morgan and Zoe Chae. During the first episode, the mission is compromised by people who claim to be associates of Mike but of whom he has no recollection. Mike reveals that a significant chunk of his memory is missing due to an unexplained trauma, which co-incides with a period when he stopped talking to Sarah. To end the damage, Carrie orchestrates his "death", thus Mike Traceur dies. Traceur renames himself Michael Knight II and continues his work with KITT.

Cast
Justin Bruening as Michael "Mike" Knight (originally known as Mike Traceur): the son of the original Michael Knight, driver of the first KITT.
Deanna Russo as Dr. Sarah Graiman: the daughter of Charles Graiman and romantic interest of Mike Knight.
Val Kilmer as the Voice of KITT: the artificially intelligent automobile. Will Arnett was originally cast for the voice of KITT and had his lines recorded but he was later replaced by Val Kilmer.
Paul Campbell as Billy Morgan
Smith Cho as Zoe Chae (Episodes 13–17, Guest Star in Episodes 1–12)
Bruce Davison as Dr. Charles Graiman: KITT's creator and Sarah's father. (Episodes 1–12)
Sydney Tamiia Poitier as FBI Agent Carrie Rivai (Episodes 1–11)
Yancey Arias as NSA Agent Alex Torres (Episodes 1–12)
Peter Cullen as the Voice of KARR 2.0, the evil artificially intelligent automobile

Production

Development
In the spring of 2007, NBCUniversal chief executive Jeff Zucker hired Ben Silverman as chief NBC programmer, and asked him to help bring NBC out of last place in network ratings. One of Silverman's early moves was to try to revive old franchises like Knight Rider and American Gladiators. Silverman, in a deal endorsed by Ford Motor Company, the car supplier, approved production. In advance of its anticipated weekly run, the new Knight Rider series was introduced with a television movie on February 17, 2008. The new series premiered on NBC on September 24, 2008 and led the network's Wednesday evening lineup, along with Deal or No Deal and Lipstick Jungle. On October 21, 2008, NBC gave the show a full season order of 22 episodes, where all of the episodes that aired on TV are also available on NBC, the PlayStation Network Video Store, Xbox Live Marketplace, Hulu Plus (available only for computer streaming, not TV or mobile streaming), and iTunes Store. The episodes are available in high-definition and standard-definition formats.

Retooling
On November 10, 2008, NBC reformatted the show in an effort to more closely resemble the storyline of its predecessor. Yancey Arias, Bruce Davison, and Sydney Tamiia Poitier's characters were removed from the series after the end of their original thirteen episode commitment starting with a two-part episode scheduled to air in January 2009. The show continued with a more character-driven focus on Michael and KITT.

Cancellation
On December 3, 2008, NBC reduced its season order from 22 to 17 episodes. The series finale aired on March 4, 2009. On May 19, 2009, NBC canceled the series after one season.

Vehicle

For the series premiere, many new features in KITT were introduced in addition to those seen on the pilot movie. As an homage to the original KITT's Super Pursuit Mode, the new KITT transforms into Attack Mode – a significantly more aggressive version than the Attack Mode depicted in the pilot movie, which consisted primarily of an extended rear spoiler. KITT also transforms into a Ford F-150 FX4 pickup truck for off-road purposes, a Ford E-150 van, Ford Flex, Ford Crown Victoria Police Interceptor, and a 1969 Mach 1 Mustang for disguise purposes. The series also demonstrated capabilities such as KITT's Turbo Boost, allowing KITT to briefly become airborne, and submergibility, maintaining system integrity and life support for occupants while underwater. Also installed in KITT are a grappling hook, a laser that originates from his scanner bar, double mini-guns, defensive flares, offensive missiles, parachute, a dart gun, a sonic inhibitor and an EMP weapon.

The interior of the vehicle has been reworked, with the single display screen on the center console replaced by touch-enabled head-up displays spanning the entire interior surface of the windshield. The removal of the center console screen has also seen KITT's "presence" indicator, reminiscent of the original series KITT's voice modulator, appearing in a pulsing orb mounted high in the middle of the dashboard with a dot in the middle that shifts over to "look" at whoever he's talking to. Other interior changes include a more conventional steering wheel, replacing the previously seen 3/4 steering wheel, blue lighting in the dashboard over the driver's-side instrumentation and the passenger-side console that becomes red whenever KITT is in Attack Mode, and a standard Mustang rear seat instead of the super-computer laden rear seat of the movie KITT. The interior of 4x4 Mode uses the same customized Mustang dashboard, but the F-150's passenger and driver's seats. KITT also carries a backup mainframe that he can reboot to in the event his primary is damaged. KITT's mechanics are high-tech industrial robots named Katie, Lisa, and Hank. They scan KITT for damages and interact with the human actors.

KITT's technology includes a surface screen program, enabling the hood to operate as a touchscreen display, similar to the internal head-up displays, a printer in the passenger-side console, and a 3D Object Generator in the rear passenger compartment, as well as a self-destruct program.

Episodes

On December 3, 2008, NBC reduced its season order to seventeen episodes. The series finale aired on March 4, 2009. On May 19, 2009, NBC announced that they would not renew Knight Rider for a second season.

Home media
Knight Rider: The Complete Series DVD was released on July 28, 2009 on a four disc set with bonus material.

See also

 Knight Rider franchise

References

External links
 

2008 American television series debuts
2009 American television series endings
American action television series
English-language television shows
Knight Rider
Knight Rider television series
Television series about robots
NBC original programming
American sequel television series
Television series by Universal Television
Malware in fiction